Rhizotrogus sassariensis is a species of beetle in the Melolonthinae subfamily that can be found in Italy and its islands such as Sardinia and French island of Corsica.

References

Beetles described in 1870
sassariensis
Beetles of Europe